{{DISPLAYTITLE:Xi2 Sagittarii}}

Xi2 Sagittarii, Latinized from ξ2 Sagittarii, is a star in the zodiac constellation of Sagittarius. Data collected during the Hipparcos mission suggests it is an astrometric binary, although nothing is known about the companion. It is visible to the naked eye with a combined apparent visual magnitude of +3.51. Based upon an annual parallax shift of 8.93 mas as seen from Earth, this system is located around 370 light years from the Sun.

The spectrum of Xi2 Sagittarii yields a mixed stellar classification of G8/K0 II/III, showing traits of a G- or K-type giant or bright giant star. It has an estimated 3.36 times the mass of the Sun and about 14 times the Sun's radius. At an age of around 380 million years, it is radiating 676 times the Sun's luminosity from its photosphere at an effective temperature of 4,541 K.

References

K-type giants
G-type giants
K-type bright giants
Astrometric binaries

Sagittarius (constellation)
Sagittarii, Xi
Durchmusterung objects
Sagittarii, 37
175775
093085
7150